Mansouri (Mansoori)() is a surname common amongst the North Africa and Middle eastern regions.
According to the United States Census for the year 2000, the last name 'Mansouri' ranked 48,877 as the most common surname.

The name Mansouri had 405 occurrences in the 2000 United States Census.

List of persons with the surname

Iranians
Arefeh Mansouri (born 1980), Iranian fashion and costume designer 
Mohammad Mansouri, Iranian footballer
Mohammad Mansouri (born 1979), Iranian footballer 
Lotfi Mansouri, Iranian opera director
Reza Mansouri, Physicist

Moroccans
Yassine Mansouri, chief of Morocco's intelligence agency.
Fatima-Zahra Mansouri, Moroccan Politician
Mimoun Mansouri, Moroccan general
Mustapha Mansouri, Moroccan politician
Zahra Mansouri, Moroccan poet

Algerians
Faouzi Mansouri, Algerian football player
Yazid Mansouri, Algerian football player
Nawal Mansouri, Algerian Volleyball player
Ismaïl Mansouri, Algerian football player

Others
David Mansouri, Scottish field hockey defender 
Tahar Mansouri, Tunisian Marathon runner
Skander Mansouri, Tunisian tennis player
Yasmine Mansouri, French tennis player (younger sister of Skander Mansouri)

Indias
Mohammad Israil Mansuri, Indian politician
Kalimuddin Shams, Indian politician
Moinuddin Shams, Indian politician
Farmud Nadaf, Nepalese politician
Adil Mansuri, Gujarati writer
Nazir Mansuri, Gujarati writer
Sam Flash, Musician

Other
Mansouri Great Mosque
Mansory, car modification firm
Mansoori, Indian Persian community in India

See also
Mansuri (disambiguation)
Mansura (disambiguation)

References 

Surnames